Leonardo Alfredo Narváez Romero (born December 10, 1980 in Cali, Valle del Cauca) is a male professional track and road cyclist from Colombia. He won two medals for his native country at the 2007 Pan American Games in Rio de Janeiro, Brazil.

Career

2003
2nd in  National Championship, Track, 1 km, Duitama (COL)
3rd in  National Championship, Track, Keirin, Duitama (COL)
2nd in  National Championship, Track, Sprint, U23, Duitama (COL)
  in Pan American Games, Track, Sprint, Santo Domingo (DOM)
  in Pan American Games, Track, Team Sprint, Santo Domingo (DOM)
2004
  in Pan American Championships, Track, Keirin, San Carlos Tinaquillo
2005
2nd in  National Championship, Track, Keirin, Colombia (COL)
2007
  in Pan American Games, Track, Keirin, Rio de Janeiro (BRA)
  in Pan American Games, Track, Team Sprint, Rio de Janeiro (BRA)
2008
1st in Track, Keirin, Cali (COL)
2009
 in Pan American Championships, Track, Sprint, Mexico City (MEX)
2010
 in Central American and Caribbean Games, Track, Keirin, Mayagüez (PUR)
 in Central American and Caribbean Games, Track, Team Sprint, Mayagüez (PUR)
 in Central American and Caribbean Games, Track, 1km time trial, Mayagüez (PUR)

References
 

1980 births
Living people
Sportspeople from Cali
Colombian male cyclists
Colombian track cyclists
Cyclists at the 2003 Pan American Games
Cyclists at the 2007 Pan American Games
Pan American Games medalists in cycling
Pan American Games gold medalists for Colombia
Pan American Games silver medalists for Colombia
Pan American Games bronze medalists for Colombia
South American Games gold medalists for Colombia
South American Games silver medalists for Colombia
South American Games medalists in cycling
Competitors at the 2010 South American Games
Medalists at the 2003 Pan American Games
Medalists at the 2007 Pan American Games
Competitors at the 2010 Central American and Caribbean Games
21st-century Colombian people